The 1978 AIAW National Small College Basketball Championship was the fourth annual tournament hosted by the Association for Intercollegiate Athletics for Women to determine the national champion of collegiate basketball among its small college members in the United States.

The tournament was held at Francis Marion College in Florence, South Carolina.

High Point defeated South Carolina State in the championship game, 92–88, to capture the Panthers' first AIAW small college national title. 

Sixteen teams participated in a single-elimination tournament that additionally included a third-place final for the two teams that lost in the semifinal games.

Tournament bracket

See also
1978 AIAW National Large College Basketball Championship

References

AIAW women's basketball tournament
AIAW Small College
AIAW National Division I Basketball Championship
1978 in sports in South Carolina
Women's sports in South Carolina